Count Nikolai Ivanovich Yevdokimov (1804-1873) was a Russian infantry general who took part in the Russo-Circassian War. He played a very major role in the Circassian genocide.

Circassian genocide 
Yevdokimov put forward the plan to remove the Circassians from their highland homeland and force them to either settle in the mainly uninhabitable swamps in the lowlands or emigrate to Turkey. From 1861 to 1864, Yevdokimov was given responsibility for carrying out the deportations. Yevdokimov’s troops, after carrying out massacres in Circassian villages, forced the remaining Circassians to flee to the coast to be shipped to Turkey. There many thousands perished from disease, lack of food and exposure. The number of Circassians who died during Yevdokimov’s deportation operations is not known with certainty but modern scholarly estimates vary between 625,000 and 1,500,000. There is clear evidence that Yevdokimov was aware of the level of fatalities caused by the deportations but continued anyway; according to historian Walter Richmond “At the very least Yevdokimov and the military personnel involved in the deportation could be considered guilty of genocide as defined under Point (c) of the United Nations Convention.”

References

Further reading 

Recipients of the Order of St. George of the Fourth Degree
Recipients of the Order of St. George of the Third Degree
Recipients of the Order of St. George of the Second Degree
People of the Caucasian War
Counts of the Russian Empire
Recipients of the Gold Sword for Bravery
Recipients of the Order of Saint Stanislaus (Russian), 2nd class
Recipients of the Order of Saint Stanislaus (Russian), 1st class
Recipients of the Order of St. Vladimir, 3rd class
Recipients of the Order of St. Vladimir, 1st class
Recipients of the Order of the White Eagle (Russia)
1804 births
1873 deaths
Circassian genocide perpetrators